Everett Keith Potter (September 27, 1911 – February 20, 1980) was a Canadian politician. He represented the electoral district of Digby in the Nova Scotia House of Assembly from 1949 to 1953. He was a member of the Progressive Conservative Party of Nova Scotia.

Early life and education
Born in 1911 at Plympton, Nova Scotia, Potter was a lumber operator by career. He graduated from Acadia University in 1935.

Political career
Potter entered provincial politics in the 1949 election, winning the Digby riding by 82 votes. He did not reoffer in the 1953 election. Potter attempted to regain the seat in the 1960 election, but lost to Liberal incumbent Victor Cardoza by 58 votes.

Death
Potter died at Sanibel Island, Florida on February 20, 1980.

Personal life
He married Ruberta Rand in 1938.

References

1911 births
1980 deaths
Acadia University alumni
Progressive Conservative Association of Nova Scotia MLAs
People from Digby County, Nova Scotia
People from Sanibel, Florida